Rhachoepalpus is a genus of flies in the family Tachinidae.

Species
R. andinus (Townsend, 1914)
 R. argenteus (Townsend, 1914)
 R. beatus (Curran, 1947)
 R. biornatus (Curran, 1947)
 R. blandus (Curran, 1947)
 R. cinereus (Townsend, 1914)
 R. ethelius (Curran, 1947)
 R. flavitarsis (Macquart, 1843)
 R. immaculatus (Macquart, 1846)
 R. metallicus (Curran, 1947)
 R. nitidus (Townsend, 1914)
 R. notatus (Curran, 1947)
 R. nova (Curran, 1947)
 R. ochripes (van der Wulp, 1888)
R. olivaceus (Townsend, 1908)
R. pulvurulentus (Schiner 1868)
 R. quatuornotatus (Townsend, 1935)
R. testacea (van der Wulp, 1888)
R. triformis (Walker, 1853)
R. tucumanus (Blanchard, 1941)

References

Tachininae
Tachinidae genera
Taxa named by Charles Henry Tyler Townsend
Diptera of North America